Walter Jessop (22 March 1899 – 25 December 1960) was an English cricketer. He played for Gloucestershire between 1920 and 1921.

References

1899 births
1960 deaths
English cricketers
Gloucestershire cricketers
Sportspeople from Cheltenham